John O'Gaunt's Castle was a royal hunting lodge in the West Riding of Yorkshire in England.

History

John of Gaunt's Castle is situated near Harrogate, now in North Yorkshire.  The castle was considered to be the hunting lodge of John O'Gaunt, Duke of Lancaster, who was Lord of the Manor of Knaresborough for twenty-eight years until 1399.

Strongly sited on the end of a spur at Haverah Park, is a ditched platform 35mx30m which had a curtain wall and a gatehouse, with a bridge over the moat. Within are buried footings of a central tower, 15m square, and 1 wall which probably formed part of a range. It was situated within the royal lordship of Knaresborough. Edward III had building works in progress here in 1334. In 1372 he granted it, along with Knaresborough to his son John of Gaunt, from whom it gained its name.

The castle was listed for the first time on December 17, 1929.

Description 

The hunting lodge was a stone tower built atop on a square foundation. The lodge also had a chapel. The roof was made out of lead.

References

See also
Beaver Dyke Reservoirs
Castles in Great Britain and Ireland
List of castles in England

Castles in North Yorkshire
Borough of Harrogate